The Selke is a river of Saxony-Anhalt, Germany.

It is a right-hand tributary of the Bode that starts in the Harz Mountains before breaking out onto the northeastern Harz Foreland.

Course 

The Selke has cut deeply into the Harz Mountains in some places whilst in others it runs in a broad valley, depending on the bedrock. In Meisdorf on the northeastern edge of the Lower Harz, the Selke leaves the forested mountain region and winds across a cultivated plain, continuing to flow in an easterly or northeasterly direction as far as Ermsleben. Beyond Ermsleben the river swings through 90° to the northwest and runs from here in an almost straight line to its mouth on the Bode near , a village in the borough of Wegeleben.

In the past Selke burst its banks on several occasions causing significant damage. This led to plans by the state government for the expansion of existing floodwater retention basins and the creation of a new one. The citizens' initiative "Save the Selke Valley in the East Harz" is fighting this plan because they argue that it will destroy a scenically beautiful section of the Selke Valley that is important for nature conservation.

Castles 
High above the Selke Valley is a striking and largely preserved medieval castle, Falkenstein, which is open to the public. Both locations are checkpoints in the Harzer Wandernadel hiking network.

Tributaries 
 Katzsohlbach (right)
 Limbach (left)
 Steinfurtbach (left)
 Westerbach (right)
 Rödelbach (right)
 Hüttenstollen
 Glasebach (right)
 Uhlenbach (left)
 Teufelsgrundbach
 Pulverbach (right)
 Schwefelbach (left)
 Friedenstalbach (left)
 Krebsbach (left)
 Schiebecksbach (right)
 Nagelbach (left)
 Titanbach (right)
 Sauerbach (left)
 Getel (left)
 Hauptseegraben (right)
 Grenzgraben (left)

See also 
 Selke Valley Railway
 Selke Valley Trail
 List of rivers of Saxony-Anhalt

References

External links 
 Rettet das Selketal! – The citizen action group's web page with map of the Selke 
 Dissertation: Der Einfluß der Bergbaugschichte im Ostharz auf die Schwermetalltiefengradienten in historischen Sedimenten und die fluviale Schwermetalldispersion in den Einzugsgebieten von Bode und Selke im Harz (pdf; 2.2 MB) 

Rivers of Saxony-Anhalt
Rivers of the Harz
 
Rivers of Germany